Angelos Ikonomou (born 23 August 1995) is a Greek professional footballer who plays as a midfielder for Super League 2 club Panserraikos.

Honours
OFI
Football League: 2017–18
Veria
Football League: 2020–21

References

1995 births
Living people
Greek footballers
Greece youth international footballers
Greek expatriate footballers
Super League Greece players
Football League (Greece) players
Super League Greece 2 players
FC Bayern Munich II players
VfB Stuttgart II players
OFI Crete F.C. players
Doxa Drama F.C. players
Platanias F.C. players
Veria NFC players
Panserraikos F.C. players
Association football midfielders
Footballers from Thessaloniki